Caspar Getman Farmstead is a historic home and related farm outbuildings located near Stone Arabia in Montgomery County, New York.  It includes the main house and ell, two lateral-entry English barns, a New World Dutch barn (c. 1790), limestone smokehouse (c. 1850), and former chicken coop (c. 1920).  The house has a two-story main block, five by five bay, with a center entrance, with an attached 1 1/2 story ell.  It has a moderately pitched gable roof and is clad in clapboards.

It was added to the National Register of Historic Places in 2010.

References

Farms on the National Register of Historic Places in New York (state)
Houses completed in 1790
Buildings and structures in Montgomery County, New York
National Register of Historic Places in Montgomery County, New York